The 2014–15 Campbell Fighting Camels basketball team represented Campbell University during the 2014–15 NCAA Division I men's basketball season. The Fighting Camels were led by second year Kevin McGeehan and played their home games at Gore Arena. They were members of the Big South Conference. They finished the season 10–22, 4–14 in Big South play to finish in tenth place. They lost in the first round of the Big South tournament to Gardner–Webb.

Roster

Schedule

|-
!colspan=9 style="background:#FF7F00; color:#000000;"| Exhibition

|-
!colspan=9 style="background:#FF7F00; color:#000000;"| Regular season

|-
!colspan=9 style="background:#FF7F00; color:#000000;"|Big South tournament

References

Campbell Fighting Camels basketball seasons
Campbell
Camp
Camp